The Río Colorado is a river of Bolivia in the Potosí Department, Nor Lípez Province.

See also
 Puka Mayu
List of rivers of Bolivia

Rivers of Potosí Department